WSHO (800 AM) is an American radio station broadcasting a Christian radio format.  Licensed to New Orleans, Louisiana, United States, the station serves the New Orleans area.  The station is currently owned by Shadowlands Communications, L.L.C. and features programming from Salem Communications.

History
The 800 kHz was originally used by a R&B formatted station WBOK in the 1950s, until they moved over to 1230 kHz in 1962.  But at the same time, WSHO, which was at 1230, moved their Broadway showtunes and call letters over to the current signal.  In the late 1960s, they switched to Country until 1981, when they dropped the format for Adult Standards, broadcasting the "Music of Your Life" syndicated format.  In 1982, they changed to religious programming.

During Hurricane Katrina, WSHO simulcasted United Radio Broadcasters of New Orleans from WWL-AM.

References

External links

FCC History Cards for WSHO

WSHO
Moody Radio affiliate stations
Radio stations established in 1953
Christian radio stations in Louisiana